The Constitution of Slovakia, officially the Constitution of the Slovak Republic, is the current constitution of Slovakia. It was passed by the Slovak National Council on 1 September 1992 and signed on 3 September 1992 in the Knights Hall of the Bratislava Castle. It went to effect on 1 October 1992 (some parts 1 January 1993).

The passing of constitution is now remembered as Constitution Day on 1 September.

History
In 1969 Czechoslovakia became a federation with the Czech Socialist Republic and Slovak Socialist Republic as its constituent parts. This happened as a result of Prague Spring reforms, which was a period of political liberalization in Czechoslovakia as a communist state after World War II. However, in 1969 the normalization period started and while formally the federation was preserved, power was again centralized. The 1968 constitutional law ‘On the Czecho-Slovak Federation’ (No. 143/1968, Art. 142), stipulated that after passing the new federal constitution, both republics would adopt their own constitutions, but this was never implemented. First works on a Slovak constitution started right after the Velvet revolution in 1990. In March 1990, a group of legal experts led by Professor Juraj Plank prepared the first draft of the Slovak Constitution.

The Slovak Constitution was prepared hastily in 1992, with many formulations taken directly from the Czechoslovak Constitution of 1920 and being marked by a compromise with socialism. According to Slovak lawyer Ján Drgonec many parts of the constitution are hard if not impossible to execute.

Overview
The text of the Constitution is divided into the preamble and 9 parts (most parts are divided into chapters), which in turn are divided into 156 articles and they may but do not need to be divided further into paragraphs and/or letters.
 The Preamble
 First part
 General provisions (a. 1 to 7a)
 State symbols (a. 8 and 9)
 Capital of the Slovak Republic (a. 10)
 Second part – Fundamental rights and freedoms
 General provisions (a. 11 to 13)
 Fundamental human rights and freedoms (a. 14 to 25)
 Political rights (a. 26 to 32)
 Rights of national minorities and ethnic groups (a. 33 and 34)
 Economic, social and cultural rights (a. 35 to 43)
 Right to protect the environment and cultural heritage (a. 44 and 45)
 Right to judicial and other legal protection (a. 46 to 50)
 Part one and part two joint provisions (a. 51 to 54)
 Third part
 Economy in the Slovak Republic (a. 55 to 59)
 Supreme Audit of the Slovak Republic (a. 60 to 63)
 Fourth part – Legal self-governing bodies (no chapters, a. 64 to 71)
 Fifth part – Legislative power
 National Council of the Slovak Republic (a. 72 to 92)
 Referendum (a. 93 to 100)
 Sixth part – Executive power
 President of the Slovak Republic (a. 101 to 107)
 Government of the Slovak Republic (a. 108 to 123)
 Seventh part – Judicial power (2 chapters)
 Constitutional Court of the Slovak Republic (a. 124 to 140)
 Judiciary of the Slovak Republic (a. 141 to 148)
 Eighth part – Office of the public prosecutors in the Slovak Republic
 Public prosecutors of the Slovak Republic (a. 149 to 151)
 Ombudsman (a. 151a)
 Ninth part – Transitory and final provisions  (no chapters, a. 152 to 156)

Amendments
Three fifths of the votes in the parliament are necessary to supplement and/or amend the Constitution. It has been amended several times.

 Amendment from 14 July 1998: This is rather a minor amendment: The President could be elected on a suggestion of at least 8 MPs (the President was voted by the parliament at that time) and some of the President's powers were transferred to the Speaker of Parliament.
 Amendment from 14 January 1999: President was no longer voted by the Parliament, and begun to be elected by popular vote for five years. It also changes the President's powers and relations between him and other institutions.
 Amendment from 23 February 2001: It is the greatest amendment so far, relating to Slovakia's attempt to enter the European Union (e.g. Slovakia will recognize international treaties). It also changes the electoral law, introduces ombudsman to the Slovak law system, transfers right to name judges for unlimited time from parliament to the President and other major or minor changes in functions of nearly all institutions.
 Amendment from 4 March 2004: Minor change to the constitution, from article 78, paragraph 2, where the last sentence was omitted.
 Amendment from 14 May 2004: Amendment was in relation to the preparation to the European Parliament election. It added sentence about inconsistency of being an MP in the Parliament and in the European Parliament. It also extended rights of the Constitutional Court of Slovakia for ruling whether the election to the EP is constitutional.
 Amendment from 27 September 2005: Expanded the authority of the Supreme Audit Office to include oversight of the finances of regional and local governments. In disputed cases, it granted the Constitutional Court the authority to decide whether the Supreme Audit Office has the constitutional right of oversight in that case.
 Amendment 3 February 2006
 Amendment 14 March 2006
 Amendment 4 March 2010
 Amendment 21 October 2011
 Amendment 26 July 2012
 Amendment from 4 June 2014: Defined marriage as a bond between one man and one woman.
 Amendment from 21 October 2014: Banned the export of drinking and mineral waters in pipelines and water tanks. The ban excludes bottled water and water for personal use.
 Amendment from 8 December 2015: Lengthened the general 48 hours limit for detention, in case of suspected terrorists to 96 hours.
 Amendment from 2 February 2017: Lengthened the term of office of officials elected in 2017 regional county elections to five years.

See also
 Constitutional Court of Slovakia

References

External links
 Official text of the Constitution on the Slovak Ministry of Justice Collection of laws website (Slovak, includes all amendments)
 The text of the Constitution on the Constitutional court website (English, includes all amendments)

Politics of Slovakia
1992 in law
Slovakia
October 1992 events in Europe
1992 in politics
1992 in Slovakia
1992 documents